Attorney General Brewster may refer to:

Abraham Brewster (1796–1874), Attorney-General for Ireland
Benjamin H. Brewster (1816–1888), Attorney General of the United States
F. Carroll Brewster (1825–1898), Attorney General of Pennsylvania
Henry Percy Brewster (1816–1884), Attorney General of Texas

See also
General Brewster (disambiguation)